Årvoll Idrettslag is a Norwegian sports club from Årvoll, Bjerke, Oslo. It has sections for association football, team handball, volleyball, orienteering and Nordic skiing.

It was founded on 16 October 1932. The club colors are red and blue. Their home field is Årvoll kunstgress.

The men's football team currently plays in the Fourth Division, the fifth tier of Norwegian football, after being relegated from the Third Division in 2010. It last played in the Norwegian Second Division in 2000.

Årvoll has a history of cooperation with other clubs in football. In 2001 it formed (together with Linderud IL and Hasle-Løren IL) the umbrella team Bjerkealliansen, which operated on junior level (age 19 and below). Hasle-Løren backed out ahead of the 2009 season. Ahead of the 2003 season Årvoll's senior team gave up its spot in the league system (then Third Division) to cooperate on the umbrella team Groruddalen BK. Groruddalen BK became a success, was promoted to the Second Division and contended for the First Division, but after the 2008 season it was over. In the meantime, Årvoll, which had started anew, had climbed back up to the Third Division.

Recent seasons
{| 
|valign="top" width=0%|

References

 Official site 

Football clubs in Oslo
Association football clubs established in 1932
1932 establishments in Norway